Jim McBride (born September 16, 1941) is an American screenwriter, producer and director.

Legacy
Richard Brody, writing for The New Yorker, named McBride as one of the twelve greatest living narrative filmmakers, citing David Holzman's Diary as a "time capsule of sights and sounds, ideas and moods, politics and history", and "one of the greatest first films", but noted that he only considered him one of the greatest for that specific film.

Filmography
 David Holzman's Diary (1967)
 My Girlfriend's Wedding (1969)
 Pictures from Life's Other Side (1971)
 Glen and Randa (1971)
 Hot Times (1974)
 Breathless (1983)
 The Big Easy (1986)
 Great Balls of Fire! (1989)
 Uncovered (1994)

Television
 The Twilight Zone (1986)
 The Wonder Years (1990–1991)
 Blood Ties (1991) (TV)
 The Wrong Man (1993) (TV)
 Fallen Angels (1995) – "Fearless" (1995) Episode
 Pronto (1997) (TV)
 The Informant (1997) (TV)
 Dead by Midnight (1997) (TV)
 To Hell and Back (2000) (TV)
 Six Feet Under (2001)

Awards
Wins
 Mannheim-Heidelberg International Filmfestival: Grand Prize; for David Holzman's Diary; 1967.
 Cognac Festival du Film Policier: Grand Prix; for The Big Easy; 1987.

Nominations
 Independent Spirit Awards: Independent Spirit Award; Best Director, for The Big Easy 1988.
 Venice Film Festival: Golden Lion; for The Informant; 1997.

References

External links

1941 births
American film editors
American male screenwriters
Place of birth missing (living people)
American television directors
Film directors from New York City
Living people
Screenwriters from New York (state)